Donna Jeanne Merwick (February 14, 1932 Chicago – August 22, 2021 Melbourne) was a historian who was Senior Fellow in the Department of History at the University of Melbourne, Long Term Visiting Fellow at Australian National University, and Adjunct Associate Professor in the Swinburne Institute for Social Research at the Swinburne University of Technology.

Early life
After studying history at Mundelein College, Merwick entered the Order of the Sisters of Charity of the Blessed Virgin Mary.  In 1962 she earned a MA from DePaul University and a Ph.D. from the University of Wisconsin–Madison.  She began teaching at Mundelein in 1966, left the Order in 1968 and began teaching at the University of Melbourne in 1971 (she retired in 1995).

Personal life
Merwick married Australian historian Greg Dening in 1971.

Publications

Boston priests, 1848-1910: a study of social and intellectual change 1973
Possessing Albany, 1630-1710: the Dutch and English experiences 1990
Death of a notary: conquest and change in colonial New York 1999
The shame and the sorrow: Dutch-Amerindian encounters in New Netherland 2006
Stuyvesant Bound: An Essay on Loss Across Time 2013

Journal articles
Geertz, Clifford, 'History and Anthropology', New Literary History, vol. 21, 1990, pp. 325–335. 
Hoffer, Peter, 'Review of Death of a notary', The Journal of American History, vol. 87, no. 4, 2001, pp. 1465–6. 
Kroen, Sheryl, 'Review of Death of a notary', Rethinking History, vol. 4, no. 2, 2000, pp. 228–230.

References

DePaul University alumni
University of Wisconsin–Madison College of Letters and Science alumni
Mundelein College alumni
American women historians
Australian women historians
Academic staff of Swinburne University of Technology
Academic staff of the University of Melbourne
1932 births
2021 deaths
People from Chicago
American women non-fiction writers
American nuns
21st-century American women